The Hormel Institute is a biomedical research center located in Austin, Minnesota, United States. Founded in 1942, the institute is a division of the University of Minnesota with scientists focusing primarily on cancer research. The Hormel Institute receives significant support from nearby Mayo Clinic.

References

External links
 The Hormel Institute

University of Minnesota
Mayo Clinic
Medical research institutes in the United States
Research institutes in Minnesota
Buildings and structures in Austin, Minnesota
Medical and health organizations based in Minnesota